Torsten Gütschow (born 28 July 1962) is a German football manager and former player who played as a striker. He is most associated with Dynamo Dresden, with whom he had two successful spells, playing top level football in East Germany and after reunification. In between these he played for three other German clubs, and spent six months with Galatasaray of the Turkish Süper Lig. A strong and instinctive goalscorer, Gütschow was top scorer in each of the last three seasons of the DDR-Oberliga, and was the last East German Footballer of the Year. He won three international caps for East Germany, scoring two goals between 1984 and 1989. Since retiring he has taken up coaching, and has been manager of TuS Heeslingen.

Playing career

In East Germany

Gütschow played as a youth for Traktor Zodel and Dynamo Görlitz, before joining Dynamo Dresden in 1976. After four years in their youth setup, he was promoted to the first-team, making his DDR-Oberliga debut in 1980. He established himself as a consistent goalscorer, and scored 17 goals in the 1984–85 season. The next two seasons were blighted by injury, but he returned to form, partnering Ulf Kirsten up front, and was the league's top scorer in its last three seasons. His seven goals in the 1988-89 UEFA Cup made him the competition's top scorer and in 1991 he was named as the last East German Footballer of the Year.

During much of Gütschow's time with Dynamo Dresden, the league was dominated by BFC Dynamo, who won ten consecutive league titles from 1979 to 1988. Dresden broke this run by winning the championship in 1989 and 1990, adding a cup win in the latter season to complete the double. They had also won the cup in 1982, 1984 and 1985.

After reunification

The last season of the DDR-Oberliga (now renamed the NOFV-Oberliga) saw Dynamo Dresden finish second, behind Hansa Rostock, and with German reunification they qualified for the Bundesliga. In their first season they finished in 14th place, and Gütschow was the team's top scorer, with 10 goals from 31 appearances. The following season, he played eight matches, scoring twice, before leaving in December 1992, joining Galatasaray of the Turkish Süper Lig. Gütschow's 12 Bundesliga goals are still the most of any Dynamo Dresden player.

Galatasaray had a German coach, Karl-Heinz Feldkamp, and two other German players in Falko Götz and Reinhard Stumpf. Gütschow settled in immediately, and scored 10 goals in 15 league appearances, as the club won a league and cup double. Gütschow only spent six months in Turkey, returning to Germany in summer 1993 but remains a popular figure with Galatasaray fans.

Gütschow returned to Germany with Carl Zeiss Jena of the 2. Bundesliga, but had a singularly unsuccessful season, making only nine league appearances and failing to score. He left Jena after one year, and followed this with single-year spells at two other 2. Liga clubs – Hannover 96 and Chemnitzer FC. He had more personal success in both these seasons, scoring 16 and 15 goals respectively, but the latter ended in relegation for Chemnitz.

In 1996, Gütschow returned to Dynamo Dresden, now in the third-tier Regionalliga Nordost. He spent three years with the club as they tried unsuccessfully to get promoted to the second division, before retiring in 1999. In total, he had made 329 league appearances for Dynamo, scoring 149 goals, across two spells.

International career
Gütschow was called up to the East Germany national team in February 1984, making his debut in a 3–1 away win against Greece. His second cap came later in the same year, also against Greece – this time he scored again in a 1–0 home win. His third and final cap didn't come until 1989, in a 1–1 draw with Finland at his home stadium in Dresden. He was also capped at under-21 level and made three appearances for the DDR Olympic team.

Coaching career 

After ending his playing career, Gütschow took up coaching. He worked with VfL Bochum's reserve team, and was manager of FC Oberneuland from 2003 to 2004. In 2006, he was appointed as manager of TuS 1906 Heeslingen, and won promotion to the Oberliga Nord in his first season. Gütchow remained at the club at seven years, leaving in at the end of the 2012–13 season when the club withdrew from the Oberliga for financial reasons. He took over at Regionalliga Norodost side TSG Neustrelitz a year later.

Stasi
Gütschow worked as an Inoffizieller Mitarbeiter (paid informant) for the Stasi. This came about after he was arrested in Sweden for drink-driving; the East German authorities offered him a deal where he would be released on condition that he would provide the Stasi with information. However, he immediately confessed this involvement to his team-mates, and promised never to report anything negative about them.

Career statistics

Club

International goals
Scores and results list East Germany's goal tally first, score column indicates score after each Gütschow goal.

Honours
Dynamo Dresden
 DDR-Oberliga: 1989, 1990
 FDGB Pokal: 1982, 1984, 1985, 1990

Galatasaray
 Süper Lig: 1993
 Turkish Cup: 1993

References

External links

 Career stats at RSSSF
 Club profile 
 
 Torsten Gütschow at Footballdatabase

1962 births
Living people
People from Görlitz
German footballers
East German footballers
Bundesliga players
2. Bundesliga players
Dynamo Dresden players
Dynamo Dresden II players
FC Carl Zeiss Jena players
Galatasaray S.K. footballers
Chemnitzer FC players
Hannover 96 players
Süper Lig players
Association football forwards
East Germany international footballers
East Germany under-21 international footballers
German expatriate footballers
Expatriate footballers in Turkey
German expatriate sportspeople in Turkey
FC Oberneuland managers
DDR-Oberliga players
People of the Stasi
Footballers from Saxony
German football managers
People from Bezirk Dresden